Aides may refer to:

AIDES, a French non-governmental organization assisting people with HIV/AIDS
Aides (skipper), a genus of skippers of family Hesperiidae
Aides (tax), a French customs duty during the time of Louis XIV
Hades, a Greek god
The plural of aide

See also 
 Aide (disambiguation)
 Assistant (disambiguation)
 HIV/AIDS